LASM could refer to:

Latin American School of Medicine (Cuba)
Latin American School of Medicine A.P. Réverénd (Venezuela)
Light Anti-Structure Missile, a version of the M72 LAW used by UK Armed Forces